The 1964 LFF Lyga was the 43rd season of the LFF Lyga football competition in Lithuania.  It was contested by 16 teams, and Inkaras Kaunas won the championship.

League standings

References 
 RSSSF

LFF Lyga seasons
1964 in Lithuania
LFF